NASA is the National Aeronautics and Space Administration.

NASA or Nasa may also refer to:

Places
11365 NASA, a main-belt asteroid
Nasa Mountain, a mountain near Arjeplog in the north of Sweden
Nasa silver mine, a silver mine on Nasa Mountain
Nasa, Ghana, a village in Ghana

People
Nasa people, an aboriginal people of Colombia
Nasa (footballer, born 1968), born Gesiel José de Lima, Brazilian football defender
Nasa (footballer, born 1979), born Marcos Antonio García Nascimento, Brazilian football attacking midfielder

Nature
Nasa (plant), a genus of plants in the family Loasaceae

Organizations
National Archives of South Africa
National Association of Students of Architecture, India
National Auto Sport Association, United States
North American Sommelier Association
National Super Alliance, a Kenyan political party formed in 2017

Art, entertainment, and media

Music

Groups
N.A.S.A. (musical group), a DJ collective
NASA (Swedish band), a Swedish synthpop band
North American Saxophone Alliance

Songs
"NASA" (song), a 2019 song by Ariana Grande
"NASA", by Dance Gavin Dance from the album Happiness, 2009

Television
Naša TV, a TV channel in the Republic of Macedonia

See also
National Aeronautics and Space Act (U.S. law) law creating the National Aeronautics and Space Administration
National Advisory Committee for Aeronautics, predecessor to the National Aeronautics and Space Administration
Nassau (disambiguation) - pronounced nearly the same as the acronym
Nasser (disambiguation)